Snotties was a reality television programme that aired on New Zealand's TV 2 (New Zealand) from August to October 2006. It won the 2006 Qantas Television Award for best observational reality program.

32 wannabe naval officers rolled up to the Royal New Zealand Navy's Officer Training School in Devonport—ranging in age from 17-year-old school leavers through to a hardened 34-year-old ex-army engineer. All had decided a life on the ocean wave was a life for them. They faced 22 weeks of intense military training—a lot physical, but also a lot spent in the classroom learning the many aspects of naval life. Snotties follows their journey.

References

New Zealand reality television series
TVNZ 2 original programming